Remember the City is a 1964 novel by Swedish author Per Anders Fogelström. It is the third novel of the City novels.

References

1964 Swedish novels
Swedish-language novels
Novels set in Stockholm
Family saga novels